Suzana Šuvaković Savić (13 January 1969 – 18 October 2016) was a Serbian operatic soprano who has had an active career as a member of National Theatre in Belgrade.

Career
Born in Majdanpek, Suzana became a member of National Theatre in Belgrade while she was a student. .

References

1969 births
2016 deaths
20th-century Serbian women opera singers
Serbian operatic sopranos
People from Majdanpek
21st-century Serbian women opera singers